The flag of Leicestershire is the flag of the historic county of Leicestershire, England. It was registered with the Flag Institute on 16 July 2021.



Flag design
The flag combines three of the county's symbols: the red and white dancetté background, taken from the arms of Simon de Montfort, 6th Earl of Leicester; the Cinquefoil of the de Beaumont Earls of Leicester; and the running fox from the county's crest, used on many of the county organisations’ emblems.

It was designed by Jason Saber and adopted at the request of all seven of Leicestershire's Members of Parliament. It was the final English county flag to be adopted, and was first flown officially for Historic County Flag Day 2021 in Parliament Square, London.

The Pantone Colours for the flag are:
 Red 485
 White
 Black

History

Prior to the registration of the flag, a banner of the coat of arms of Leicestershire County Council was often marketed as a county flag for Leicestershire, however legally speaking, this banner represents only the council, and flying it requires its permission.

A public competition was held to select a design for a flag for Leicestershire from six finalists in November 2020. However, no flag design was adopted as a result of the competition, because the fox and cinquefoil design was disqualified as it was available commercially prior to the start of the contest.

As the competition was abandoned, seven of Leicestershire's MPs wrote to the Flag Institute requesting the fox and cinquefoil design be registered.

Gallery

References

External links
Flag Institute - Leicestershire Flag competition

Leicestershire
Leicestershire
Flags displaying animals
Leicestershire